The 2016–17 season is the Esteghlal Football Club's 16th season in the Persian Gulf Pro League, their 23rd consecutive season in the top division of Iranian football, and 71st year in existence as a football club. They also compete in the Hazfi Cup and AFC Champions League.

Club

Coaching Staff
{| class="wikitable"
|-
!Position
!Staff
|-
|Head coach ||  Alireza Mansourian
|-
|Assistant coach ||  Ali Chini
|-
|Assistant coach ||  Mohammad Khorramgah
|-
|Assistant coach ||  Saleh Mostafavi
|-
|Goalkeeper coach ||  Hamid Babazadeh
|-
|Fitness coach ||  Steven Jones
|-
|Physiotherapist ||  Amin Noroozi
|-
|Doctor ||  Kaveh Sotoudeh
|-
|Analyst||  Kianoush Forouzesh
|-
|Team Manager ||  Mansour Pourheidari
|-

Other information

 Mohammad hossein Zarandi

|-

Kit

Kit information

First team squad
Last updated: 22 May 2017

Persian Gulf Pro League squad

 List of Esteghlal squad in Iran league Organization
 [U19 = Under 19 Player | U21 = Under 21 Player | U23 = Under 23 Player]

New contracts

Transfers

In

Summer

Winter

Out

Summer

Winter

Loan in

Summer

Loan out

Winter

Friendly Matches

Pre-season

Mid-season

Competitions

Overview

Persian Gulf Pro League

Standings

Results summary

Results by round

Matches

Hazfi Cup

AFC Champions League

Qualifying play-off

Group stage

Knockout stage

Statistics

Appearances and goals

Disciplinary record
Includes all competitive matches. Players with 1 card or more are included only.

Top scorers
The list is sorted by shirt number when total goals are equal.

Clean sheets
The list is sorted by shirt number when total clean sheets are equal.

Goals conceded
The list is sorted by shirt number when total 'minutes played' are equal.

See also
 2016–17 Persian Gulf Pro League
 2016–17 Hazfi Cup
 2017 AFC Champions League

References

External links
 Iran Premier League Statistics
 Persian League

Esteghlal F.C. seasons
Esteghlal